Poblana is a genus of Neotropical silversides that are endemic to Mexico, with each of the four threatened species restricted to a single Oriental Basin maar lake. They are small fish that do not surpass  in standard length.

Species
FishBase recognizes four species in this genus, although genetic differences between them are very limited and some regard all as subspecies of P. alchichica. Poblana is sometimes included in Chirostoma instead of being regarded a separate genus.

 Poblana alchichica F. de Buen, 1945 (Alchichica silverside)
 Poblana ferdebueni Solórzano & Y. López, 1965 (Chignahuapan silverside)
 Poblana letholepis Álvarez, 1950 (La Preciosa silverside)
 Poblana squamata Álvarez, 1950 (Quechulac silverside)

References 

 
Atherinopsidae
Freshwater fish of Mexico
Taxonomy articles created by Polbot